Fakhrossadat Mohtashamipour is an Iranian reformist activist.

She served as the head of women's affairs at the Ministry of Interior.

Along with Azar Mansouri and late Farideh Mashini, she is among the senior women members of Islamic Iran Participation Front and pioneers of Iranian NGOs working for women's rights. She is executive manager of the NGO Association of Women Entrepreneurs and chair of the board of directors of the Association of History and Women Researchers.

References 

Living people
Islamic Iran Participation Front politicians
Iranian women's rights activists
Proponents of Islamic feminism
Year of birth missing (living people)
Members of the National Council for Peace